Darbhanga gharana is a gharana, or tradition, of the Hindustani classical music dhrupad thought to have been started in the eighteenth century by Radhakrishna and Kartaram, musicians in the court of the Maharaja of Darbhanga. The style is notable for its vocal delivery and energetic performances, as well how the songs are sung after the alap. Notable singers of the Darbhanga gharana include Ram Chatur Mallick, Vidur Mallick and Siyaram Tiwari.

History

The tradition was prominent at the start of the twentieth century, but started to decline after India gained its independence. Pandit Siyaram Tiwari's music is considered by many musicians of Darbhanga gharana to have embodied its essence. In 2019 a centenary concert was held in his memory in August 2019 as part of an attempt to revitalise the tradition.

Style
Darbhanga gharana is based on the Gauhar Vani of dhrupad and is unique in that it has equal balance between the alap, or opening section, and the bandish instead of emphasising the alap as is typical in other dhrupad gharanas.

References

Gharana
Indian styles of music
Music of Bihar